The NECAT Network, known formally as the Nashville Education, Community and Arts Television Network, is a group of local non-commercial educational public and educational access television channels headquartered in Nashville, Tennessee, and serving the entire Middle Tennessee region. Its offices and broadcast facilities are at 120 White Bridge Road in Nashville, Davidson County, Tennessee.

History
The NECAT Network was founded after the Metro Nashville city government-backed merger of Metropolitan Educational Access Corporation and the Community Access Corporation. Both organizations had 30 years of operating locally owned cable channels in the Nashville area.

Through its franchise agreement with the city government, the NECAT Network’s channels are partially funded by main cable server Comcast and the city government.

Like many other public access television stations, local residents can produce their own programs with these channels.

Channels 
The NECAT Network operates three non-commercial public and educational access cable-exclusive television stations. Here are the channels that the NECAT Network operates:   
Access Nashville is the main public access television station for the area, whose schedule mainly includes locally produced programming, including some local music shows, telecasts of local church services, a few local talk shows, and more. This channel can be seen on Comcast channel 19. 
Music City Arts Channel (MCAtv), seen on Comcast channel 9, is the public arts channel, involving local shows related to music, art, dance, film, and more. 
iQtv is the educational access channel on Comcast channel 10. This channel features programming originating from the Metro Nashville Public Schools, the Nature Conservancy (Tennessee Chapter), and the Nashville area Chamber of Commerce. Documentaries, educational programs, and lectures are involved in IQTV’s schedule.

These channels are also available in 19 middle Tennessee counties via AT&T U-Verse.

References

External links
NECAT Network - official website 
NECAT Networks Facebook Page

Mass media in Nashville, Tennessee
Television stations in Nashville, Tennessee
Television stations in Tennessee
American public access television